Phillip Andrew Burton  (born 13 March 1974) is a member of the Australian pop vocal band Human Nature with Toby Allen, Andrew Tierney and his brother Michael Tierney since 1989.

With Human Nature, he has won an ARIA Music Award for Reach Out: The Motown Record.

Biography

Phil Burton grew up in Sydney, New South Wales and studied at Hurlstone Agricultural High School where he met Toby Allen and Andrew Tierney. The three were in the same year level and worked in the school productions of Godspell and Grease. They formed a band named, 4Trax, and performed for the first time in 1989 at a schools' combined concert singing "Earth Angel".

With Human Nature, Burton has won a Highest Selling Album ARIA Music Award for Reach Out: The Motown Record in 2006. As from 2009, the band has had 16 ARIA nominations. During 2009, the band performed in Las Vegas at the Imperial Palace Hotel and Casino. They returned to Australia in November and performed with Smokey Robinson at the Wyndham Estate in the Hunter Region in December.

Burton married Justine Smith, who had worked in marketing and communications for a financial company. The couple lived in Belrose, New South Wales, before moving to Las Vegas in 2009. As of October 2016, they have two children.

References

General
  Note: Archived [on-line] copy has limited functionality.
  Note: [on-line] version established at White Room Electronic Publishing Pty Ltd in 2007 and was expanded from the 2002 edition.

Specific

External links

 Human Nature official website

1974 births
Living people
Singers from Sydney
Australian pop singers
Human Nature (band) members
21st-century Australian singers
Recipients of the Medal of the Order of Australia